Monument to Shah Ismail Khatai is a monument raised on one of the streets of Baku (Azerbaijan) in the honour of Shah Ismail Khatai, the king of Safavid Iran.

History 
The monument was raised in 1993 at the intersection of Yusif Safarov and Mehdi Mehdizade streets in the front of the Khatai metro station in Baku. The sculptors of the monument are Ibrahim Zeynalov, the Honored Art Worker of the Azerbaijan SSR, People's Artist of the Azerbaijan SSR, and Zakir Mehdiyev, sculptor, artist and teacher, and the architects are P.Huseynov, and G. Aliyev. The monument is made of bronze and granite.

In 2007, the pedestal of the monument was reconstructed, the monument was faced with slabs of pink granite, and the sculpture itself was restored. Also, work was carried out on the landscaping of the park around the monument.

In 2017, during the expansion of the carriageway of Yusif Safarov Street, the alley was liquidated, but the Khatai monument was preserved. In 2020, the monument was moved to a new park.

References

1993 establishments in Azerbaijan
Monuments and memorials in Baku